The Subcommittee on Energy, Climate and Grid Security is a subcommittee within the United States House Committee on Energy and Commerce. It was formed during the 112th Congress from the Energy and Environment Subcommittee when a new Environment and Economy Subcommittee was created. Until the 118th Congress, it was named the Subcommittee on Energy. The committee also had responsibility for climate policy transferred to it from the United States House Energy Subcommittee on Environment and Climate Change in the 118th Congress.

Jurisdiction
The Subcommittee's jurisdiction includes national energy policy generally; fossil energy, renewable energy resources and synthetic fuels; energy conservation; energy information; energy regulation and utilization; utility issues and regulation of nuclear facilities; interstate energy compacts; nuclear energy and waste; the Clean Air Act; all laws, programs, and government activities affecting such matters; and Homeland security-related aspects of the foregoing.

Members, 118th Congress

Historical membership rosters

115th Congress

116th Congress

117th Congress

External links
 Official homepage

References

Energy Energy and Air Quality